The Temple of One Thousand Buddhas is a Tibetan Buddhist temple in the commune of La Boulaye, located in the French region of Burgundy. The temple, founded in 1987, follows the Karma Kagyu tradition. It lies in the middle of Dashang Kagyu Ling, a Buddhist retreat center established by the Tibetan lama, Kalu Rinpoche in 1974.

References

Buddhist temples in France
Tibetan Buddhism in France
Tibetan Buddhist organizations
21st-century Buddhist temples
21st-century architecture in France